Marino Sabbadini (born 10 December 1969, in Belgium) is a Belgian retired footballer.

References

Belgian footballers
Living people
1969 births
Association football midfielders
R.W.D. Molenbeek players
K.V. Mechelen players
Beerschot A.C. players